A single tax is a system of taxation based mainly or exclusively on one tax, typically chosen for its special properties, often being a tax on land value. The idea of a single tax on land values was proposed independently by John Locke and Baruch Spinoza in the 17th century. The French physiocrats later coined the term impôt unique because of the unique characteristics of land and rent.

Pierre Le Pesant, sieur de Boisguilbert and Sébastien Le Prestre de Vauban also recommended a single tax, but unlike the physiocrats, they rejected the claim that land has certain economic properties which make it uniquely suitable for taxation, so they instead proposed a flat tax on all incomes.

In the late 19th and early 20th century, a populist single tax movement emerged which also sought to levy a single tax on the rental value of land and natural resources, but for somewhat different reasons. This "Single Tax" movement later became known as Georgism, after its most famous proponent Henry George. It proposed a simplified and equitable tax system that upholds natural rights and whose revenue is based exclusively on ground and natural resource rents, with no  additional taxation of improvements such as buildings. Some libertarians advocate land value capture as a consistently ethical and non-distortionary means to fund the essential operations of government, the surplus rent being distributed as a type of guaranteed basic income, traditionally called the citizen's dividend, to compensate those members of society who by legal title have been deprived of an equal share of the earth's spatial value and equal access to natural opportunities (see geolibertarianism).

Related taxes derived in principle from the land value tax include Pigouvian taxes to internalize the external costs of pollution more efficiently than litigation, as well as severance taxes on raw material extraction to regulate the depletion of unreplenishable natural resources and to prevent irreparable damage to valuable ecosystems through unsustainable practices such as overfishing. 

There have been other proposals for a single tax concerning property, goods, or income. More recently others have made proposals for a single tax based on other revenue models, such as the FairTax proposal for a consumption tax and various flat tax proposals on personal incomes.

See also

 Excess burden of taxation
 FairTax
 Flat tax
 Geolibertarianism
 Georgism
 Land value tax
 List of taxes
 Market distortion
 OneTax
 Optimal tax
 Proportional tax
 Single tax parties:
 Henry George Justice Party (Australia)
 Justice Party of Denmark
 Single Tax League (Australia)
 Tax equity
 Tax incidence
 Tax reform
 Tax shift
 9-9-9 Plan

References

Property taxes
Economic ideologies
Tax reform
Georgism
Land value taxation